The Insurgency in Ogaden was an armed conflict that took place from 1994 to 2018. It was fought by separatists, the Ogaden National Liberation Front (ONLF), against the Ethiopian government. The war began in 1994, when the ONLF tried to separate Ethiopia's Somali Region from Ethiopia. It ended in a peace agreement as part of Prime Minister Abiy Ahmed's reforms.

Background

The Huwan region was gradually incorporated into the Ethiopian Empire in the late 19th century, making it a buffer zone between the state and expanding European interests in the region. Unlike the rest of Ethiopia it is populated by the Ogadeni people, a subgroup of Somalis. For most of its history under Ethiopian administration Ogaden was regarded as an inhospitable land, inhabited by uncivilized people who did not adhere to Christianity. Isolated military garrisons were erected through the land, exacting taxes from the local herders.

In 1936, Italy annexed Ethiopia in the aftermath of the Second Italo-Ethiopian War, integrating Ogaden into Italian Somalia and thus creating an ethnically homogenous Greater Somalia. In 1941, Britain defeated Italian East Africa, later installing a military administration of its own. The reunification of Ogaden with Somalia as well as the advocacy of British foreign minister Ernest Bevin for the creation of a Greater Somali state forged what later came to be Somali nationalism. Hopes of a unified Somali state were not put into practice as Ogaden was gradually reincorporated into Ethiopia between 1948–1954. Somalia then began to sponsor the Western Somali Liberation Front and the Somali Abo Liberation Front, armed separatist factions operating within Ethiopia. The 1969 and 1974 Coup d'états in Somalia and Ethiopia respectively led to an unsuccessful Somali invasion of Ogaden. Ethiopia emerged victorious from the war, turning Ogaden into a militarized zone and conducting population transfers in order to quell any signs of sedition.

In the meantime the Eritrean People’s Liberation Front and the Tigrayan People's Liberation Front overthrew the Ethiopian Derg dictatorship, leading to a period of political instability. The Ethiopian People's Revolutionary Democratic Front assumed power by creating a coalition of ethno-nationalist movements from across the country, choosing the previously marginalised Ogaden National Liberation Front as its ally in Ogaden. ONLF's previously exiled leadership returned from exile, gaining the support of local population. Eritrea attained independence in the aftermath of the Eritrean War of Independence, inspiring ONLF to pursue a similar goal for Ogaden. In January 1993, ONLF candidate Abdillahi Mohammed Sadi was elected Somali Regional president by receiving 70% of the votes, Sadi was however sacked by Tigray People’s Liberation Front officials seven months later creating a power vacuum. Tensions between the TPLF and ONLF escalated in 1994, as ONLF split into a moderate wing willing to cooperate with TPLF and a radical secessionist wing led by Ibrahim Abdallah Mah that initiated armed struggle.

Timeline
The outbreak of the conflict soon attracted the attention of jihadist elements in the region. The Somali militant group Al-Itihaad al-Islamiya, established a training camp in Luuq, while portraying the war as a clash of Christianity and Islam. Its Ogaden wing later conducted a series of attacks on major Ethiopian cities. Osama bin Laden described Ogaden as place where Muslims were oppressed by a “Judeo-Christian alliance” during his 1996 declaration of jihad against the United States. Al-Qaeda agents had previously infiltrated Ogaden, investing $3 million in smuggling foreign fighters into the region. Fighters from Turkey, Bosnia, Egypt, France, Gambia and other countries joined the conflict taking part in 35 engagements between June – July 1996. However, Islamist involvement in the war fell into obscurity after three successful government operations against Al-Itihaad al-Islamiya, that took place on 9 August 1996, 20 December 1996 and January 1997. Bin Laden's relocation from Sudan to Afghanistan also shifted Al-Qaeda's focus from the region. Some members of the insurgency have expressed a desire for their own independent state.

On 20 December 1996, Ethiopian troops perpetrated a cross border raid on an Al-Itihaad al-Islamiya camp in Luuq, killing over 58 militants including 48 foreign volunteers.

On 13 April 2003, ONLF initiated the Operation Mandad, aiming the expulsion of government troops from the districts of Korahey and Dolo. Two days later a battle took place in the towns of Alen and Garas Qalo, security forces suffered 60 fatalities and lost 2 army trucks, 41 rebels were also killed in the fighting. Authorities responded by imposing curfews on the towns of Kebri Dehar, Warder, and Shilabo, 36 suspected militants were also arrested.

On 1 October 2005, insurgents launched attacks against government troops stationed in the towns of Hamarro and Fik, killing 4 and injuring 5 soldiers.

On 2 October 2005, the town of Gasan and an army base located in the district of Kebri Dehar came under a militant attack, 5 soldiers were slain and 6 wounded.

On 19 October 2005, rebels attacked an army encampment in the area of Kudunbur, 11 soldiers were killed and 13 wounded.

On 15 November 2005, Ethiopian troops allegedly committed a massacre of 30 civilians and prisoners after the later demanded better treatment from their captors.

On 13 March 2006, an ONLF delegation conducted a briefing with officials representing the Danish foreign ministry, human rights abuses were discussed during the meeting.

On 23 July 2006, a communique issued by ONLF announced the shootdown of an Ethiopian airforce, transport helicopter. The incident reportedly took place in the vicinity of the town Gabo Gabo, Qorahay zone, 20 soldiers were killed in the aftermath.

On November 28, 2006, the ONLF threatened that it would not allow Ethiopian troops to stage into Somalia from their territories. On December 23, the ONLF claimed to have attacked an Ethiopian column near Baraajisale heading to Somalia, destroying 4 of 20 vehicles, inflicting casualties and driving the convoy back. No independent source has confirmed the attack.

On January 10, 2007, ONLF condemned Ethiopia's entry into the war in Somalia, stating that Meles Zenawi's invasion of Somalia demonstrated that his government had been an active participant in the Somali conflict with a clear agenda aimed at undermining the Somali sovereignty. On January 15, ONLF rebels attacked Ethiopian soldiers in Kebri Dahar, Gerbo, and Fiq. Five Ethiopian soldiers and one ONLF rebel were reported killed.

On 24 April 2007, ONLF launched an attack on a Chinese owned oil facility in Abole, a total of 74 people were killed in the attack including 9 Chinese citizens.

In response to the April 2007 ONLF attack, Ethiopian security forces initiated a large scale counter insurgency campaign against the ONLF. Between June 2007 – May 2008 approximately 1,000 people were killed as the opposing faction engaged in combat and committed human rights abuses.

On 3 July 2007, an ONLF ambush outside the town of Shilaabo resulted in the deaths of 43 soldiers, the separatists suffered 5 casualties and 8 rebels were injured.

On 22 January 2008, a government official announced the death of former top guerrilla commander Mohamed Sirad Dolal, following an operation in the Denan woreda of the Gode zone. By the time of his death Sirad had left ONLF and operated as a commander of Al-Itihad Al-Islami.

On 3 August 2009, an Ethiopian court convicted Bashir Ahmed Makhtal, an Ethiopian born Canadian citizen to life in prison, on charges of belonging to ONLF. Makhtal denied all allegations, stating that the reason behind his prosecution is his relation to one of ONLF's founding members.

On 27 October 2009, an ONLF spokesman accused the governments of Puntland and Somaliland of handing over ONLF rebels to the Ethiopean security forces.

On 11 January 2011, Ethiopian authorities freed 402 previously imprisoned ONLF members as part of a peace deal, previously signed with one of ONLF's factions.

On 4 July 2011, government troops killed 15 and detained 6 rebels, 2 Swedish journalists accompanying the militants were also wounded during the engagement.

On 2 September 2011, a band of ONLF rebels attacked a military convoy escorting Chinese oil workers, outside the city of Jijiga. The insurgents claimed to have killed 25 soldiers while suffering several casualties, a government spokesman denied the ambush took place.

Between 16–17 March 2012, according to a Human Rights Watch report, Ethiopian special police forces executed 10 civilians and looted dozens of shops in the village of Raqda, the attack came as a retaliation for the recent death of several policemen.

Between 10 – 24 October 2013, ONLF carried out attacks on 13 military outposts in the Korehey and Nogob zones, the faction claimed to have killed 24 soldiers during the operation.

On 6 December 2013, government troops engaged insurgents in the Banbaas, Qolaji and Hora-hawd villages, a rebel spokesman declared that 45 soldiers were killed in the battle, as rebels captured caches of weaponry and other equipment.

Between 1 June – 9 July 2014, five Ethiopian nationals were gunned down in the city of Garissa, Kenya. Investigations into the murders revealed the victims to be ONLF members or sympathizers, three Ethiopians and two Kenyans were detained in connection with the murders. The perpetrators allegedly belong to Ethiopian government militias. An ONLF official accused the militias of killing at least 10 Ogadenian refugees between 2010–2011.

On 26 February 2015, a Liyuu police unit skirmished with ONLF rebels in the Las-Galol village south-east of the city of Harar. A day earlier clashes took place in Galalshe, Jigjiga area. The incident took place amidst an escalation in fighting following the death of ONLF commander Mustafe Haybe, two journalists and allegedly 120 government soldiers in recent engagements.

In 2018, the Ethiopian government launched a number of reforms, part of which were removing the ONLF from its list of banned movements and offering the rebels more attractive peace deals. The ONLF declared a ceasefire in August and signed an official peace deal in October, promising to disarm and transform into a political party. About 2,000 fighters disarmed in the next months, and were given lessons as well as offers to either switch to civilian jobs or become part of security forces.

Human rights situation

A number of non-government organisations have accused the Ethiopian military and police of committing human rights violations. A Human Rights Watch representative compared the actions of Ethiopian security forces to crimes against humanity. Ethiopian soldiers and policemen have reportedly participated in numerous instances of rape, arbitrary detention, selective killings, torture and vandalism. In 2005, Ethiopian troops allegedly destroyed a village populated by the Armak minority, killing the denizens with metal bars. New York Times journalists reporting on the story were detained without charges and had their equipment confiscated. Ethiopia's tight control on the access of independent journalists into the region, has complicated the examination of assertions made by both sides of the conflict. ONLF activists have also claimed that Ethiopian officials used foreign aid as a form of blackmail, purposefully starving thousands of people. The above accusations have been dismissed by the Ethiopian government, which accused NGOs of acting as propaganda tools while completely ignoring abuses committed by the guerrillas.

See also
Papua conflict
Ethiopian Civil War
Red Terror (Ethiopia)
Ogaden War
War in Somalia (2006–2009)

References

External links 
Ogaden Today

 
Wars involving Ethiopia
Wars involving the states and peoples of Africa
Civil wars involving the states and peoples of Africa
Civil wars post-1945
20th-century conflicts
21st-century conflicts
Guerrilla wars
Insurgencies in Africa
Insurgency